The  is a railway line operated by Kintetsu Railway. There are through trains to the Chūō Line of Osaka Municipal Subway.

The line is the sole Kintetsu line with a third rail electrification system. Before 2015, it was the only Kintetsu line that had station numbers (the station numbers coming from the Chūō Line).

History 
16 September 1977 -  was founded.
1 April 1986 - Kintetsu merged with Higashi-Osaka Ikoma Railway Co.
1 October 1986 -  from Nagata to Ikoma was opened and through operation to Osakako on the Chūō Line was started.
18 December 1997 - The through operation was extended to Cosmosquare.
28 July 1998 -  was founded.
October 2000 - The construction of the  started.
31 January 2005 - The Keihanna New Line extension was officially named the "".
27 March 2006 - The line from Ikoma to Gakken Nara-Tomigaoka was opened and the Higashi-Osaka Line was renamed the Keihanna Line.

Stations

References

External links
 
 Official route overview 
 Nara Ikoma Rapid Railway 

Lines of Kintetsu Railway
Osaka Metro
Rail transport in Osaka Prefecture
Rail transport in Nara Prefecture
Standard gauge railways in Japan
Railway lines opened in 1986
1986 establishments in Japan